Kees Pier Tol (born 1 January 1987) is a Dutch professional footballer who plays as a forward for Go Ahead Kampen.

Early and personal life
Born in Volendam, Tol is the nephew of former footballer Pier Tol.

Career
Tol made his professional debut in the 2008–09 season with Cambuur. After a season with the amateur RKAV Volendam, Kol returned to the professional game in 2010 with FC Volendam.

References

External links
 

1987 births
Living people
People from Volendam
Dutch footballers
Footballers from North Holland
Association football forwards
SC Cambuur players
FC Volendam players
SV Spakenburg players
VV Spijkenisse players
Alphense Boys players
Eerste Divisie players
Derde Divisie players